1875 Upper Hunter colonial by-election may refer to 

 June 1875 Upper Hunter colonial by-election caused by the death of Francis White
 August 1875 Upper Hunter colonial by-election because the June by-election was overturned by the Election and Qualifications Committee

See also
 List of New South Wales state by-elections